Cambaz can refer to:

 Cambaz, Karacabey
 Cambaz, Kastamonu
 Cambaz, Yenice